Airlie is a small unincorporated community in Fauquier County, Virginia situated between US Route 17 and US Route 29. The village itself runs along State Route 605, which is named Airlie Road. It is home to the Airlie Conference Center and Harry's Restaurant. The original post office for Airlie was closed and the building was converted to be part of the meeting facilities in the 1990s.  Airlie is within the Warrenton 20187 ZIP Code.

Unincorporated communities in Fauquier County, Virginia
Unincorporated communities in Virginia